Mariam Issoufou Kamara (born April 1979, in Saint-Étienne, France) is a Nigerien architect. Her designs focus on open living spaces and make use of locally produced materials available to African communities: cement, recycled metal and raw earth.

Biography 
Mariam Issoufou Kamara was born in 1979.

Kamara's first career ambition was to become a computer engineer, for which she earned a Purdue University bachelor's degree in technical computing (2001) and then a master's degree in computer science from New York University (2004). She worked in the computing field for seven years before deciding to change careers and become an architect to fulfill her teenage ambition.

In 2013, Kamara earned her master's degree in architecture from the University of Washington. Her thesis, Mobile Loitering, focuses on gender issues in Niger's public spaces. Her master's work was exhibited at the Triennale di Milano in 2014 at the Africa Big Chance Big Change exhibition.

Professional career 
She co-founded the architectural group united4design (2013) while still living in the United States, and on her return to Niger she established an architecture and research firm called Atelier Masomi (2014), which focuses on open living spaces in local architecture.

The international collective of architects participating in United4design worked on projects in the United States, Afghanistan and Niger. Kamara's designs feature buildings with geometric shapes and rely on three locally produced materials available to many communities: cement, recycled metal and raw earth.

In 2017, she taught urban studies as an adjunct associate professor at Brown University in Rhode Island.

In 2022, Kamara was appointed as Full Professor of Architecture Heritage and Sustainability at ETH Zurich in Switzerland.

Major projects

Niamey 2000 
Her first major project was Niamey 2000, an apartment complex built in 2016 and designed in collaboration with Yasaman Esmaili, Elizabeth Golden and Philip Sträter. The project addresses the spatial problems linked to the concrete structure of Kamara's childhood home built in Niamey in the 1960s.

The result is four structures made by combining earth and cement fitted together. A notable feature is a bench in the front that allows the reintroduction of the traditional faada - local gatherings of friends and family that routinely occur in the space between the house and the street, which is also a historical gathering place.

Hikma en Dandaji 
In 2018, she worked again with Yasaman Esmaili to produce the project Hikma ("wisdom" in Arabic) in Dandaji, which is in the Tahoua region of Niger. Inspired by the rammed earth building technique, the project is a cultural complex that includes a mosque, library and community center. Their work combines the two types of knowledge "without contradiction, between secular knowledge and faith." For each project, Kamara's preparation is key.For each of her achievements, Kamara conducts field surveys in order to better understand the expectations of future inhabitants: how do they live and how do they receive? How comfortable will they be, culturally at ease? What will allow them to lower the temperature inside their house? The Legacy Restored Center project thus required six months of observations. As a result, it offers a citizen space open to all inhabitants of the village of Dandaji, promotes the education of women and strengthens their presence in the community.The project won two awards at the Lafarge Holcim Awards (2017), the largest competition of sustainable architecture of the world.

Niamey Cultural Center 
Kamara is working with the British architect of Ghanaian origin, David Adjaye, to plan a new cultural center in Niamey.

Bët-bi Museum 
In May 2022, Kamara was selected by a jury to lead the design of the new Bët-bi museum in Senegal. The project will be supported by the Josef and Anni Albers Foundation and its sister-organisation Le Korsa, and is set to open in 2025.

Awards received 
 2017: LafargeHolcim Awards for sustainable construction: 
 Silver medal in the Global category 
 Gold medal in the Middle East Africa regional category
 2018: Rolex Mentor and Protege Arts Initiative award enabling her to collaborate with architect David Adjaye
2019: Prince Claus Prize in the Netherlands

Selected work 
 Kamara, Mariam. Mobile Loitering: A response to public space needs in Niger's post-colonial, highly gendered urban context. Diss. 2014.

References

External links 

Photos of Kamara's Hikma en Dandaji
Sketches of the design of a girls' school in Balkh, Afghanistan by Kamara and Yasaman Esmaili  
Website of Atelier Masomi 

   

1979 births
Living people
People from Niamey
Nigerien women
Women architects
Nigerien architects
21st-century businesswomen
University of Washington alumni
New York University alumni
Purdue University alumni